Vojislav Gološin (born 27 February 1930) is a Serbian wrestler. He competed in the men's Greco-Roman featherweight at the 1960 Summer Olympics.

References

External links
 

1930 births
Possibly living people
Serbian male sport wrestlers
Olympic wrestlers of Yugoslavia
Wrestlers at the 1960 Summer Olympics
Sportspeople from Zrenjanin